Lommbock is a 2017 German comedy film directed by Christian Zübert. It is a sequel to the 2001 film Lammbock.

Cast 
 Lucas Gregorowicz - Stefan Becker
 Moritz Bleibtreu - Kai
 Louis Hofmann - Jonathan
 Mavie Hörbiger - Sabine
 Alexandra Neldel - Jenny
 Melanie Winiger - Yasemin
 Wotan Wilke Möhring - Frank
 Antoine Monot, Jr. - Schöngeist
 Dar Salim - 10 Jahre Bau
 Elmar Wepper - Vater Becker

References

External links 

2017 comedy films
German comedy films
German sequel films
German films about cannabis
2010s German films
Films produced by Sönke Wortmann